This list includes bear conservation centers, bear forests, bear refuges and bear reserves around the world.

List

Weblinks 
 http://bearsanctuary.com/bear-sanctuaries-around-world

References 

 
Animal welfare